Hanna Henning (1884–1925) was a German film director, producer and screenwriter. She was the most prominent and prolific women director working in the German film industry during the silent era.

Selected filmography
 Bubi Is Jealous (1916)
 Under the Spell of Silence (1916)
 Poor Little Helga (1918)
 Triumph of Life (1919)
 The Seventeen-Year-Olds (1919)
 The Big Light (1920)
 The Fear of Women (1921)
 The Demon of Kolno (1921)
 On the Red Cliff (1922)

References

Bibliography
 Foster, Gwendolyn Audrey. Women Film Directors: An International Bio-critical Dictionary. Greenwood Publishing Group, 1995.

External links

Hanna Henning at filmportal.de

1884 births
1925 deaths
Film people from Stuttgart
Women film pioneers